The Coimbatore Golf Club is an 18-hole golf course located in a place called  Chettipalayam in Coimbatore, located within the city limits in the state of Tamil Nadu in India.  The club is also a popular venue for major Golf Tournaments held in India.

History

The club was formed by few enthusiasts in Coimbatore in 1977, who till then used to drive up to the Golf courses in Ooty, Coonur and Kodaikanal.  Initially, the club laid out a 9-hole course in Jail grounds in the city.  Later in 1985 the Club laid out a new course designed by one of the founders G.K. Rajagopal in Chettipalayam village, 17 km from the city centre. The Founder President of The Coimbatore Golf Club was Mr.K.Venkatesalu.

Location

The Course is located in Chettipalayam, 17 km from the Coimbatore city center in Tamil Nadu state of India. The course is located in at the base of the Nilgiri Mountains.

External links
 Official Site
 Profile of the Club

Golf clubs and courses in Tamil Nadu
Organisations based in Coimbatore
Sport in Coimbatore
1985 establishments in Tamil Nadu
Sports venues in Coimbatore
Sports venues completed in 1985
20th-century architecture in India